Laguna is a populated place situated in Yuma County, Arizona, United States. It is one of two places in Arizona with this name, the other being located in Pinal County.

Gold placers were discovered in the area in 1850s, which led to the settlement coming into existence in the 1860s as a mining town. Laguna was located near the site of what would become the Laguna Diversion Dam, on the Colorado River, at the west end of the Laguna Mountains. One of the facilities comprising the U.S.'s Desert Training Center, Camp Laguna, was named after this location and the nearby mountains of the same name.

References

Populated places in Yuma County, Arizona